Kennerley is a surname. Notable people with the surname include:

Alfred Kennerley (1810–1897), Australian politician, Premier of Tasmania 1873–76
Kerri-Anne Kennerley (born 1953), Australian light entertainment host
Kevin Kennerley (born 1954), English footballer
Mitchell Kennerley (1878–1950), English-born American publisher
Paul Kennerley (born 1948), English singer-songwriter, musician and record producer